Khichdi is a Hindi language sitcom produced by UTV Software Communications in association with Hats Off Productions, which debuted on STAR Plus on 10 September 2002. The series has been rerun on STAR Plus and its sister channels several times. It served as the first series in the Khichdi franchise. The second series in the franchise was called Instant Khichdi, which aired on Star Plus's sister channel, STAR One. The reruns have aired on several channels including STAR Utsav and Pogo. A twenty-episode third series also titled Khichdi premiered on 14 April 2018 on StarPlus.

Premise 

Khichdi follows the story of a Gujarati family called Parekhs, who lives in an old mansion. The joint family encounters many typically Indian situations, but they try to solve it in the most atypical fashion imaginable. This is a funny bunch of people that are firmly united in their movement to get separated. They want to sell their ancestral property and move out and form their own nuclear families. But the head of their family does not agree. He gives them the choice to walk out and survive on their own, but nobody is ready to let go of the money that is due to them. So they stay together and wait for the 'head' to change his mind or stop breathing, whichever happens first. And this is where the upwardly mobile middle-class joint family faces its trials and tribulations. Khichdi examines the lighter side of an Indian joint family.

Characters

Main

Guest appearances
 Alpana Buch as School Teacher
 Amit Bhatt as various characters'
 Amit Singh Thakur as George Fernandaz, Melissa's father
 Anurag Prapanna as Pritam Bharadwaj
 Apara Mehta as Sandhya
 Arvind Vaidya as Chandrakant Seth
 Asha Bachani as Shiela Fernandaz, Melissa's mother
 Dilip Rawal as Inspector Dheeman Zhaveri
 Disha Vakani as various characters
 Ghanashyam Nayak as various characters
 Kabir Sadanand as grown-up Jacky
 Kalpana Diwan as Jagdamba Maami
 Kishwer Merchant as Rambha
 Krunal Pandit as School Principal's bodyguard
 Madhur Mittal as Honey Mehta
 Mayank Tandon as Hoshi
 Nitin Vakharia as Hotel Manager
 Nimisha Vakharia as Jyotsana Bai
 Prakash Bharadwaj as various characters
 Pratima T. as Hasumati Ben
 Rajesh Kumar as Chaggan / Vinod Kumar
 Rita Bhaduri as Hemlata Seth
 Sharad Sharma as Khabheja
 Shweta Tiwari as herself
 Simple Kaul as Manthara
 Sonu Kakkar as herself, in the Navratri special episode 
 Suchita Trivedi as Mayuraakshi
 Tapan Bhatt as Rajesh Gulati
 Vaishali Parmar as Praveena
 Vipra Rawal as Rekha Miss
 Utkarsh Mazumdar as various characters

Awards and nominations 
Khichdi has been almost continuously awarded television awards ever since its debut

Indian Television Academy Awards
Winner
2004: Best Actress-Comedy - Supriya Pathak as Hansa

Indian Telly Awards
Winner
2003: TV Actor in a Comic Role (Female) - Supriya Pathak as Hansa
2004: BEST Actor in a Comic Role (Male) - Rajeev Mehta as Praful
2004: Sitcom Writer of the Year - Aatish Kapadia

Nominated
2003: TV Child Artiste of the Year - Yash Mittal as Jacky
2004: The TV Sitcom / Comedy programme of the Year
2004: Lyricist of the Year - Aatish Kapadia
2004: Music Director of the Year - Uttank Vora
2004: Director of the Year (Sitcom) - Aatish Kapadia
2004: Child Artiste of the Year (Female) - Richa Bhadra as Chakki
2004: Child Artiste of the Year (Male) - Yash Mittal as Jacky
2004: Actor in a Comic Role (Male) - Rajeev Mehta as Praful
2004: Actor in a Comic Role (Male) - Anang Desai as Tulsidas Parekh
2004: Actor in a Comic Role (Female) - Supriya Pathak as Hansa
2004: Actor in a Comic Role (Female) - Vandana Pathak as Jayshree
2004: Ensemble (complete star cast of a programme)
2004: The Weekly Serial of the year
2004: Scriptwriter of the year - Aatish Kapadia

See also
 List of Hindi comedy shows

References

External links

 Khichdi on hotstar
Khichdi officially uploaded Episodes
 Official Site on STAR Utsav

Hindi comedy shows
StarPlus original programming
Indian comedy television series
Indian television series
Indian television sitcoms
2002 Indian television series debuts
UTV Television
2004 Indian television series endings
Television series about dysfunctional families
Hats Off Productions